The 38th Infantry Division (Reserve) was a unit of the Polish Army in the interbellum period (see: Second Polish Republic). It was created by merging several units of the Border Defence Corps, and its purpose was to support activities of Army Kraków and Army Karpaty, which guarded southern border of Poland. Its commandant was Colonel Alojzy Wir-Konas.

The Division was formed on September 9, 1939 (see: Polish September Campaign). After concentration, which took place in the area of Nizankowice, it was transferred to the Army Karpaty and on September 11, it began withdrawal towards the Romanian Bridgehead. On the road, it recaptured the town of Sadowa Wisznia, which had been occupied by German 1st Mountain Division. The division was assigned two out of three from the 1. Heaviest Artillery Regiment.

On September 17 the Division found itself in the area of Janów Lubelski, where it was surrounded by the Germans. A battle ensued, in the evening the Division reached Brzuchowice in the suburbs of Lwów. Two days later the survivors managed to enter Lwów.

See also
 Polish army order of battle in 1939
 Polish contribution to World War II
 List of Polish divisions in World War II

References

Infantry divisions of Poland
Military units and formations established in 1939
Infantry divisions of Poland in World War II
Military units and formations disestablished in 1939